Luis Miguel Rodríguez may refer to:

 Luis Miguel Rodríguez (baseball), Cuban baseball player
 Luis Miguel Rodríguez (footballer), Argentine footballer known as la pulga (the flea)

de:Luis Rodríguez
es:Luis Rodríguez
ja:ルイス・ロドリゲス